The 1967 NC State Wolfpack football team represented North Carolina State University during the 1967 NCAA University Division football season. The Wolfpack were led by 14th-year head coach Earle Edwards and played their home games at Carter Stadium in Raleigh, North Carolina. They competed as members of the Atlantic Coast Conference, finishing in second.

The Wolfpack began the year with 8 consecutive victories, including a win over the second-ranked Houston Cougars. The team climbed as high as No. 3 in the AP Poll, which is to date the highest ranking achieved in school history. A loss to Penn State derailed their perfect season, and a loss to Clemson the next week cost them the ACC title. NC State was ranked 17th in the final Coaches Poll of the season, conducted before bowl season (the AP Poll ranked only 10 teams from 1962 to 1967). They were invited to the 1967 Liberty Bowl, where they defeated Georgia.

Defensive lineman Dennis Byrd became NC State's first ever consensus first-team All-American, being selected by 6 of 7 official selectors.

Schedule

References

NC State
NC State Wolfpack football seasons
Liberty Bowl champion seasons
NC State Wolfpack football